Lambert Lombard (c. 1505 – August 1566) was a Renaissance painter, architect and theorist for the Prince-Bishopric of Liège. During his career he worked for Jan Gossaert in Middelburg and trained Frans Floris.

Biography
Lombard was born in Liège, where in 1532 he became court painter and architect. A few paintings and many drawings have been preserved.

In 1537, he was sent to Rome by Érard de La Marck, prince-bishop of Liège, to buy works of art, and he discovered the wonders of the Italian Renaissance. On his return he brought not only works of art, but also the new ideas concerning art and the position of the artist, to Liège.

Dominicus Lampsonius wrote a biography of Lombard, The Life of Lambert Lombard.

References

External links

  2006 Lambert Lombard exposition
 Lombard at World Wide Arts Resources
 The Life of Lambert Lombard by Domenicus Lampsonius, original latin version (1565) on Google Books
Pieter Bruegel the Elder: Drawings and Prints, a full text exhibition catalog from The Metropolitan Museum of Art, which includes material on Lambert Lombard (see index)
The engravings of Giorgio Ghisi, a full text exhibition catalog from The Metropolitan Museum of Art, which contains material on Lambert Lombard (see index)
 

1505 births
1566 deaths
Early Netherlandish painters
Flemish Renaissance painters
Court painters
16th-century painters from the Prince-Bishopric of Liège